Aras Kaya (born Amos Kibitok on 4 April 1994 in Kenya) is a Turkish suspended long-distance runner. He won the silver medal in the 3000 metres steeplechase at the 2016 European Athletics Championships. Kaya earned four individual medals at the European Cross Country Championships, including two golds.

He tested positive for erythropoietin (EPO) on 25 September 2022 and was subsequently banned by Athletics Integrity Unit for 3 years starting on 4 December 2022. All results from 25 September 2022 were disqualified.

Achievements

Competition record

National titles
 Turkish Athletics Championships
 5000 metres: 2020

Personal bests
 3000 metres – 7:57.67 (Bursa 2020)
 3000 metres indoor – 7:54.63 (Istanbul 2017)
 5000 metres – 13:23.91 (Cheboksary 2015)
 5000 metres indoor – 13:31.85 (Moscow 2015)
 10,000 metres – 27:48.53 (Mersin 2015)
 3000 m s'chase – 8:29.91 (Amsterdam 2016)
Road
 10 kilometres – 29:20 (Herzogenaurach 2022)
 Half marathon – 1:00:51 (Gdynia 2020)

References

External links

 

1994 births
Living people
Kenyan male steeplechase runners
Kenyan male long-distance runners
Turkish male long-distance runners
Turkish male steeplechase runners
Turkish male cross country runners
Kenyan male cross country runners
Kenyan emigrants to Turkey
Naturalized citizens of Turkey
European Athletics Championships medalists
Olympic athletes of Turkey
Athletes (track and field) at the 2016 Summer Olympics
European Cross Country Championships winners
Athletes (track and field) at the 2018 Mediterranean Games
Mediterranean Games competitors for Turkey
Islamic Solidarity Games competitors for Turkey
Islamic Solidarity Games medalists in athletics
Athletes (track and field) at the 2022 Mediterranean Games
21st-century Turkish people